Jacob Magraw-Mickelson (born 1982) is an American artist who lives and works in Pasadena, California. He graduated with a BFA in illustration from the Art Center College of Design, in Pasadena, in 2004. His work includes paintings, illustrations, and silk-screen prints.

Work 
Most of Magraw-Mickelson’s paintings and drawings depict brightly colored organic forms, sometimes interlaced with architectural scenes. His work is characteristically detailed and his forms delicate and often plant-like. His drawings have accompanied several articles in The New York Times. His paintings have been featured in Anthropologie’s 2007 Summer catalog and on the cover of Chuck Palahniuk’s book, Rant: An Oral Biography of Buster Casey. Magraw-Mickelson’s work has also appeared in Fishwrap Magazine, McSweeney’s Quarterly, and Dear New Girl, or Whatever Your Name Is, edited by Lisa Wagner (McSweeney's, 2005).

Exhibitions
Magraw-Mickelson has shown work in numerous group exhibitions and in the following solo exhibitions:
2006 Tiny Island, Motel, Portland, OR
2006 Marvelous Sea, Giant Robot, Los Angeles, CA
2007 Richard Heller Gallery, Los Angeles, CA

External links
Richard Heller Gallery

References

American illustrators
Artists from California
1982 births
Living people
Place of birth missing (living people)